The Turn is a 2012 short film, written and directed by Christian Krohn. It stars James Phelps in one of his first roles since playing Fred Weasley in the Harry Potter film series. The film also stars Tim Bentinck and Richard Rycroft.

The film is about faded comedian Stanley Kovack (Tim Bentinck). After a lull in success, he becomes desperate and steals the notes and material from a young, upcoming comedian Morris Talliver (James Phelps), whilst they are performing together at The Comedy Club, London. The success that follows is in stark contrast to the fortunes of Morris, whose career takes a resulting downward turn.

Cast
 James Phelps as Morris Talliver
 Tim Bentinck as Stanley Kovack
 Richard Rycroft as George
 Graham Dickson as Arthur Penn
 Rob Tofield as the Heckler
 Andrew Pugsley as Tom
 James Ivens as Henry
 Lewis Allcock as the Bartender
 Nicholas Anscombe as the BBC Booker
 Roger Parkins as a Comedian
 Callum Hale as a Comedian

References

External links
 

2012 short films
2012 films
British short films
2010s English-language films